The Red Main Spring is the source of the Red Main river, the left-hand and southern headstream of the River Main in Germany. Although the Red Main is several kilometres longer than the Weiße Main, the stronger White Main Spring is seen as the source of the Main itself. 

The Red Main Spring was enclosed in stone in 1907 and, from there, the water flows along a narrow wooden pipe. The source region lies in the Franconian Switzerland-Veldenstein Forest Nature Park and belongs geologically to the Brown Jura. 

The river gets its name from the boggy red subsoil and the associated fluvial sediment that gives it its red appearance. In the vicinity of the Red Main Spring is the origin of the Fichtenohe, the upper course of the River Pegnitz.

References

External links 

Springs of Germany
SRed Main Spring